Lucienne Favre (4 January 1894 – 21 March 1958) was a 20th-century French writer and playwright. She was an algerianist. She was among the first to doubt the authenticity of the Muslim persona of the Jewish-Algerian writer Elissa Rhaïs.

Publications 
Novels
1925: Dimitri et la Mort, Ferenczi et fils
1926: Bab-el-Oued, Crès  et Cie
1927: L'Homme derrière le mur, preface by Pierre Mac Orlan, Crès et Cie
1929: La Noce, ed. Bernard Grasset
1930: Orientale 1930, Bernard Grasset, « Les Écrits », 1930 ; Grand Prix littéraire d'Algérie
1933: Tout l'inconnu de la Casbah d'Alger, illustrations by Charles Brouty, Alger, Baconnier
1936: « Un dimanche dans la Casbah », Les Œuvres littéraires issue 184, October 1936
1941: Mille et un jours, les aventures de la belle Doudjda, Gallimard
1937: Dans la Casbah, Grasset
1939: Le Bain juif, Grasset
1942: Mourad, La Toison d'or
1946: Doudjda, Denoël
1948: Mourad II, Denoël

Theatre
1934: Isabelle d'Afrique
1935: Prosper, légende en quatre parties et douze tableaux, Alger, Baconnier, 1935 ; directed by Gaston Baty at the Théâtre Montparnasse

Translations 
 The Temptations of Mourad, translated from the French by Willard R. Trask, New York, W. Morrow, 1948

See also 
 Algerianism

Bibliography 
 Denise Brahimi, Femmes arabes et sœurs musulmanes, Tierce, 1984, p. 75 
 Sakina Messaadi, Les romancières coloniales et la femme colonisée : contribution à une étude de la littérature coloniale en Algérie dans la première moitié du XXe siècle, Éditions ANEP, 2004, p. 44
 Écrivains français d'Algérie et société coloniale 1900-1950, Éditions Kailash, « Les Cahiers de la Sielec #5 », 2008

References

External links 
 Lucienne Favre on data.bnf.fr

20th-century French novelists
20th-century French dramatists and playwrights
French women dramatists and playwrights
1894 births
Writers from Paris
1958 deaths
20th-century French women writers